K. Shivanagouda Nayaka is an Indian politician belonging to the Bharatiya Janata Party. He is a former minister of Karnataka. He was elected to the Karnataka Legislative Assembly from Raichur district. He unsuccessfully contested the 2014 Lok Sabha election from Raichur against B V Nayak.

References

Living people
Bharatiya Janata Party politicians from Karnataka
National Democratic Alliance candidates in the 2014 Indian general election
People from Raichur district
Year of birth missing (living people)
Karnataka MLAs 2018–2023
Karnataka MLAs 2008–2013